The Coptic script is the script used for writing the Coptic language, the latest stage of Egyptian. The repertoire of glyphs is based on the uncial Greek alphabet, augmented by letters borrowed from the Egyptian Demotic. It was the first alphabetic script used for the Egyptian language. There are several Coptic alphabets, as the script varies greatly among the various dialects and eras of the Coptic language.

History

The Coptic alphabet has a long history, going back to the Hellenistic period, when the Greek alphabet was used to transcribe Demotic texts, with the aim of recording the correct pronunciation of Demotic. During the first two centuries of the Common Era, an entire series of spiritual texts were written in what scholars term Old Coptic, Egyptian language texts written in the Greek alphabet. Seven letters, however, were derived from Demotic, and many of these (though not all) are used in “true” form of Coptic writing. With the spread of Christianity in Egypt, by the late 3rd century, knowledge of hieroglyphic writing was lost, as well as Demotic slightly later, making way for a writing system more closely associated with the Christian church. By the 4th century, the Coptic alphabet was "standardized", particularly for the Sahidic dialect. (There are a number of differences between the alphabets as used in the various dialects in Coptic). Coptic is not generally used today except by the members of the Coptic Orthodox Church of Alexandria to write their religious texts. All the Gnostic codices found in Nag Hammadi used the Coptic alphabet.

The Old Nubian alphabet—used to write  Old Nubian, a Nilo-Saharan language —is written mainly in an uncial Greek alphabet, which borrows Coptic and Meroitic letters of Demotic origin into its inventory.

Form 
The Coptic alphabet was the first Egyptian writing system to indicate vowels, making Coptic documents invaluable for the interpretation of earlier Egyptian texts. Some Egyptian syllables had sonorants but no vowels; in Sahidic, these were written in Coptic with a line above the entire syllable.

The Coptic alphabet's glyphs are largely based on the Greek alphabet, another help in interpreting older Egyptian texts, with 24 letters of Greek origin; 6 or 7 more were retained from Demotic, depending on the dialect (6 in Sahidic, another each in Bohairic and Akhmimic).

As the Coptic alphabet is simply a typeface of the Greek alphabet, with a few added letters, it can be used to write Greek without any transliteration schemes. Latin equivalents would include the Icelandic alphabet (which likewise has added letters), or the Fraktur alphabet (which has distinctive forms). While initially unified with the Greek alphabet by Unicode, a proposal was later accepted to separate it, with the proposal noting that Coptic is never written using modern Greek letter-forms (unlike German, which may be written with Fraktur or Roman Antiqua letter-forms), and that the Coptic letter-forms have closer mutual legibility with the Greek-based letters incorporated into the separately encoded Cyrillic alphabet than with the forms used in modern Greek. Because Coptic lowercases are usually small-caps forms of the capitals, a Greek would have little trouble reading Coptic letters, but Copts would struggle more with many of the Greek letters.

Letters 
These are the letters that are used for writing the Coptic language. The distinction between capital and lowercase is a modern invention.

Letters derived from Demotic 
In Old Coptic, there were a large number of Demotic Egyptian characters, including some logograms. They were soon reduced to half a dozen, for sounds not covered by the Greek alphabet. The following letters remained:

Numerals 
The numerical value of the letters is based on Greek numerals. Sometimes numerical use is distinguished from text with a continuous overline above the letters, as with Greek and Cyrillic numerals.

Unicode 

In Unicode, most Coptic letters formerly shared codepoints with similar Greek letters, but a disunification was accepted for version 4.1, which appeared in 2005. The new Coptic block is U+2C80 to U+2CFF. Most fonts contained in mainstream operating systems use a distinctive Byzantine style for this block. The Greek block includes seven Coptic letters (U+03E2–U+03EF highlighted below) derived from Demotic, and these need to be included in any complete implementation of Coptic.

Diacritics and punctuation 

These are also included in the Unicode specification.

Punctuation 
 Latin alphabet punctuation (comma, period, question mark, semicolon, colon, hyphen) uses the regular Unicode codepoints for punctuation
 Dicolon: standard colon U+003A
 Middle dot: U+00B7
 En dash: U+2013
 Em dash: U+2014
 Slanted double hyphen: U+2E17

Combining diacritics 

These are codepoints applied after that of the character they modify.

 Combining overstroke: U+0305 (= supralinear stroke)
 Combining character-joining overstroke (from middle of one character to middle of the next): U+035E
 Combining dot under a letter: U+0323
 Combining dot over a letter: U+0307
 Combining overstroke and dot below: U+0305,U+0323
 Combining acute accent: U+0301
 Combining grave accent: U+0300
 Combining circumflex accent (caret shaped): U+0302
 Combining circumflex (curved shape) or inverted breve above: U+0311
 Combining circumflex as wide inverted breve above joining two letters: U+0361
 Combining diaeresis: U+0308

Macrons and overlines

Coptic uses  to indicate syllabic consonants, for example .

Coptic abbreviations use  to draw a continuous line across the remaining letters of an abbreviated word.  It extends from the left edge of the first letter to the right edge of the last letter.  For example, a common abbreviation for  'spirit'.

For this the line begins in the middle of the first letter and continues to the middle of the last letter.

See also
 Coptic pronunciation reform
 Institute of Coptic Studies

References

Quaegebeur, Jan. 1982. "De la préhistoire de l'écriture copte." Orientalia lovaniensia analecta 13:125–136.
Kasser, Rodolphe. 1991. "Alphabet in Coptic, Greek". In The Coptic Encyclopedia, edited by Aziz S. Atiya. New York: Macmillan Publishing Company, Volume 8. 30–32.
Kasser, Rodolphe. 1991. "Alphabets, Coptic". In The Coptic Encyclopedia, edited by Aziz S. Atiya. New York: Macmillan Publishing Company, Volume 8. 32–41.
Kasser, Rodolphe. 1991. "Alphabets, Old Coptic". In The Coptic Encyclopedia, edited by Aziz S. Atiya. New York: Macmillan Publishing Company, Volume 8. 41–45.
 Wolfgang Kosack: Koptisches Handlexikon des Bohairischen. Koptisch - Deutsch - Arabisch. Verlag Christoph Brunner, Basel 2013, .

External links 

Michael Everson's Revised proposal to add the Coptic alphabet to the BMP of the UCS
Final Proposal to Encode Coptic Epact Numbers in ISO/IEC 1064
Copticsounds – a resource for the study of Coptic phonology
Phonological overview of the Coptic alphabet in comparison to classical and modern Greek.
Coptic Unicode input
Michael Everson's Antinoou: A standard font for Coptic supported by the International Association for Coptic Studies.
 Ifao N Copte – A professional Coptic font for researchers, students and publishers has been developed by the French institute of oriental archeology (IFAO). Unicode, Mac and Windows compatible, this free font is available through downloading from the IFAO website (direct link).
Coptic fonts ; Coptic fonts made by Laurent Bourcellier & Jonathan Perez, type designers
: Coptic font support – how to install, use and manipulate Coptic ASCII and Unicode fonts
Download Free Coptic Fonts
The Coptic Alphabet (omniglot.com)
GNU FreeFont Coptic range in serif face

Coptic language
Copt
Alphabets
Writing systems of Africa
Ancient Egyptian language
Coptic Orthodox Church